Otis Bryant Thayer (1862 – August 16, 1935) was an American actor, director, producer and owner of silent era film production companies. Before his film career he was a stage actor and operatic comedian. By 1910, he piloted the Chicago based Selig Polyscope Company filming westerns on locations at Canon City. He founded the Art-O-Graf film company of Denver in 1919. And by 1920, he was the president of the "Superior Foto Play Company."

Career
As a director
1911 - The Bully of Bingo Gulch, A Romance of the Rio Grande, Circumstantial Evidence
1912 - An Equine Hero, The Whiskey Runners, A Cowboy's Mother, The Wayfarer, The Boob, An Unexpected Fortune, The Peculiar Nature of the White Man's Burden, The Double Cross, Murray the Masher, The Adopted Son, The Mystery of Room 29, A Citizen in the Making, The Vagabonds, According to Law, Jack and Jingles, Driftwood, His Chance to Make Good, All on Account of Checkers, The Slip, Hypnotized, The 'Diamond S' Ranch, The Horseshoe, The Girl He Left Behind, A Cowboy's Best Girl, A Modern Ananias, Two Men and a Girl
1913 - Saved by the Juvenile Court
1914 - Across the Border, Bringing in the Law, The Romance of Copper Gulch, Pirates of the Plains, The Ace of Diamonds, The Range War
1915 - Montana Blunt, Out of the Silence, The Word, Told in the Rockies, The Parasite's Double, The Cost, The Greater Barrier
1916 - The Unborn, The Awakening of Bess Morton, The Sins That Ye Sin
1917 - The Love of Princess Olga, The Prodigal's Return, The Mystery of No. 47, A Social Climber, The Daughter of Gas House Dan, The Evil Sag, Two-Dollar Gloves, A Question of Honesty, Father and Son, The Boob, The Power of Pin Money, The Great Treasure
1918 - Little Red Riding Hood 
1919 - Miss Arizona (1919 Film)
1920 - A Desperate Tenderfoot, Wolves of the Street (1920 Film), The Desert Scorpion
1921 - Out of the Depths (1921 Film), The Outlaw's Revenge, The Golden Lure, A Western Feud, Finders Keepers (1921 Film)
1923 - Riders of the Range (1923 Film)
1928 - Tracy the Outlaw, Finders Keepers

As an actor
1911 - Western Hearts, Why the Sheriff Is a Bachelor, Told in Colorado, A Tennessee Love Story, A New York Cowboy, A Fair Exchange, The Warrant, Dan Thomas - the Sheriff, Two Lives, The New Editor, The Mission Worker, Montana Anna, A Novel Experiment, Busy Day at the Selig
1912 - Circumstantial Evidence, The Wayfarer, The Boob, The Double Cross, Murray the Masher
1914 - Pirates of the Plains
1920 - The Desert Scorpion

As a writer
1911 - The Bully of Bingo Gulch, A Romance of the Rio Grande
1912 - The Scapegoat, Riders of the Range

As a producer
1928 - Tracy the Outlaw

Personal life and death
Educated in Freeport, Illinois. Son of William Henry Harrison and Letitia Ann (Morgan) Thayer, husband of Gertrude M. Cavagna.

Founder of Art-O-Graf Film Co., and was President and Director for General Superior Foto Play Company.

References

External links

 tcm.com
 

1862 births
1935 deaths
American directors
20th-century American male actors
People from Richland Center, Wisconsin
Film producers from Wisconsin